Yuri Vyacheslavovich Grymov (born July 6, 1965, Moscow, USSR)  is a Russian film director, clipmaker, screenwriter, producer. Member of the Public Chamber of the Moscow Oblast, Academician of  Motion Picture Arts.

Winner of the Epica Awards (1993, 1994) and Kinotavr Festival (1998)

He served as inspiration for the character of Gera Kremov in Grigori Konstantinopolsky's cult crime-comedy 8 ½ $.

Filmography 
 Men's revelation  (in the novel by Renata Litvinova The Third Way) (1996)
 Lessons Anita Tsoi  (documentary) (1998)
 Mu-mu  (based on the novel by Ivan Turgenev. The new reading of classics (1998)
 The Collector (based on the novel by Levan Varazi The Collector and His Relatives) (2001)
 Kukotsky’s Casus (based on the novel  by Lyudmila Ulitskaya) (2005)
 Strangers (2008) 
 By the Feel (2010)

References

External links
 Official Site
   
 Yuri Grymov Blog on blogmetro.ru
 Юрий Грымов в программе Дневники на TVJAM.RU
   «Работа режиссёра с артистом — это как интимные отношения»

1965 births
Living people
Russian film directors
A Just Russia politicians
21st-century Russian politicians
Recipients of the Nika Award
Russian film producers
Russian art directors
Academicians of the Russian Academy of Cinema Arts and Sciences "Nika"
Russian music video directors